Skarvflytindene is a mountain group in Vågå Municipality in Innlandet county, Norway. The mountain is surrounded by several other notable mountains including Tjønnholstinden and Tjønnholsoksle to the east, Rasletinden and Kalvehøgde to the southeast, Leirungskampen and Leirungstinden to the southwest, and Knutsholstinden and Nordre Knutsholstinden to the west.

See also
List of mountains of Norway by height

References

Jotunheimen
Vågå
Mountains of Innlandet